The South of Scotland Football League (SoSFL) is a senior football league based in south-west Scotland. The league sits at level 6 on the Scottish football league system, acting as a feeder to the Lowland Football League.

Founded in 1946, it is currently composed of 12 member clubs in a single division. Geographically, the league primarily covers Dumfries and Galloway with one club located in South Lanarkshire.

Since 2014–15 it has featured in the senior pyramid system. The winners take part in an end of season promotion play-off with the East of Scotland Football League and West of Scotland Football League champions, subject to clubs meeting the required licensing criteria.

History

Original league
A league of the same name briefly existed during the early days of competitive football. The original South of Scotland Football League was created in 1892–93 and featured seven clubs:

5th Kirkcudbrightshire Rifle Volunteers
Cronberry Eglinton
Lanemark
Lugar Boswell
Mauchline
Queen of the South
Springbank

The clubs preferred to play in cup competitions and traditional friendlies, so most of the league fixtures were not played. The competition was subsequently abandoned and no championship was awarded.

Current league
When league football was re-established in 1946, the Southern Counties League name could not be used because Ayr United 'A' and Kilmarnock 'A' were not members of the Southern Counties F.A.. Instead, the new competition was called the South of Scotland Football League. The first season saw the league played in two sections, East and West, but it has been played as a single league ever since.

Teams play each other on a home and away basis. In seasons where league membership has been low, clubs have played each other four times, instead of the usual twice. Recent changes in league membership have been:
Stranraer Athletic withdrew from the league at the end of the 2007–08 season.  
 The newly formed Gretna 2008, founded to replace the Gretna team that had been forced to dissolve following its meteoric rise to the Scottish Premier League between 2002 and 2007, applied to join the South of Scotland League, but then joined the East of Scotland Football League instead. 
Annan Athletic withdrew their reserve team from the league at the end of the 2008–09 season, so that they could concentrate on the SFL Under-19 League and the Reserve League West. 
Stranraer withdrew their reserve team from the league at the end of the 2011–12 season.
Dalbeattie Star and Threave Rovers withdrew from the league at the end of the 2012–13 season to join the newly formed Lowland Football League, although Threave have since been relegated back to the league.
After 44 Seasons in the Dumfries and District Amateur Football League, champions Lochar Thistle were elected to the league for the start of the 2013–14 season.
Three new teams Dumfries YMCA, Edusport Academy and Upper Annandale were elected to the league for the 2014–15 Season.
Fleet Star withdrew from the league in 2016. Crichton, who were saved from folding last season by a merger with Lochmaben Amateurs, have taken the Lochmaben name and moved to Lockerbie.
Bonnyton Thistle joined the league in 2017 before moving to the newly formed West of Scotland Football League in 2020.

Member clubs

League membership 
Bold indicates a current league member.

Notes:
 Crichton was known as Blackwood Dynamos until 1999. The club was to be called Crichton Royal, but the suffix has never been used.
 Dumfries was formed by the merger of Dumfries High School Former Pupils and Dumfries Amateurs.
 Heston Rovers Youth (formed in 1978) merged with Dumfries in 2008, retaining Heston Rovers as the name of the new club.
 Annan Athletic (1987–2008), Dalbeattie Star (2001–2009) and Threave Rovers (1998–2004) have all run teams in the East of Scotland League. From the 2008–09 season, Annan Athletic has played in the Scottish Football League. Dalbeattie Star and Threave Rovers joined the newly formed Scottish Lowland Football League for the 2013–14 season.
 The following clubs have resigned during the season:
 Creetown 1975–76 
 Girvan 1978–79 
 Gretna Community 1991–92 
 RAF West Freugh 1948–49 
 St Cuthbert Wanderers 1977-78 
 Wigtown & Bladnoch 1962–63 and 1972–73 
 Dumfries United resigned prior to the start of the 1987–88 season.

Cup competitions
In 1950, the league's membership had been reduced to just seven clubs. To compensate for the lack of fixtures, the League Cup was introduced. The final is usually contested by the winners of two mini-leagues, but has also been played as a straight knock-out competition. There was no separate League Cup competition between 1962–1968 and 1973–1975. Instead the trophy was awarded to the runner-up in the League.

The Southern Counties Cup, also known as the Challenge Cup, is the league's main knockout competition. It has been played for since 1891, and the first winners were the 5th Kirkcudbrightshire Rifle Volunteers.

Newton Stewart, St Cuthbert Wanderers, Threave Rovers, and Wigtown & Bladnoch are full members of the Scottish Football Association therefore enter the Scottish Cup, as do the winners of the league.

Holders 
2021–22 winners unless stated.

 SFA South Region Challenge Cup: Auchinleck Talbot
 Alba Cup: Abbey Vale (2022–23)
 South & East of Scotland Cup-Winners Shield: Drumchapel United
 South of Scotland League Cup: Upper Annandale (2018–19)
 Southern Counties FA Challenge Cup: Bonnyton Thistle (2018–19)
 J Haig Gordon Memorial Trophy: Edusport Academy (2018–19)
 SCFA Potts Cup: No competition
 WDFA Cree Lodge Cup: Mid-Annandale (2018–19)
 WDFA Tweedie Cup: No competition

List of winners 

* Team promoted to the Lowland League

Total titles won 
Clubs currently playing in the league are shown in bold.

References

External links 
 Official league website
  Final Tables 1892 to date (pdf file)

 
Football in Dumfries and Galloway
6
Scot